Park Ji-hu (born November 7, 2003) is a South Korean actress. She is best known for her leading roles in the 2018 film House of Hummingbird and 2022 Netflix original series, All of Us Are Dead.

Early life and education 
Park was born in Daegu, South Korea. She was accepted in Hanyang University's department of theater and film in November 2021.

Career

2014–present: Beginnings and breakthrough
In 2014, Park started acting occasionally after participating in a street audition. She then made her acting debut in the short film Home Without Me in 2016, before landing minor roles in mainstream productions Vanishing Time: A Boy Who Returned (2016), Fabricated City (2017), and The Witness (2018).

In 2018, Park starred in indie sensation House of Hummingbird, playing her first leading role in a feature film. She achieved recognition and won multiple accolades for her performance in the movie.

As of April 2021, Park is filming Um Tae-hwa's disaster thriller film Concrete Utopia alongside Lee Byung-hun, Park Bo-young and Park Seo-joon.

In 2022, she gained international recognition after appearing in the zombie apocalypse Netflix original series, All of Us Are Dead. She is also appearing in tvN's series Little Women alongside Kim Go-eun, Nam Ji-hyun and Wi Ha-joon, which is also streaming on Netflix.

Filmography

Film

Television series

Web series

Music video appearances

Awards and nominations

References

External links
  
 
 
 

South Korean film actresses
South Korean television actresses
South Korean child actresses
21st-century South Korean actresses
Living people
2003 births
People from Daegu